Jade Stacy Schiffman is an American ophthalmologist and former professional tennis player.

Schiffman, a left-handed player from New York, featured on tour in the 1960s and 1970s. She made the main draw of the 1968 US Open as a last-minute alternate and won through to the second round, beating Carole Herrick.

While competing on the professional circuit, Schiffman was also studying for a medical degree at Upstate Medical University in Syracuse. She is now working as an ophthalmologist in Houston.

References

External links
 

Year of birth missing (living people)
Living people
American female tennis players
Tennis people from New York (state)
State University of New York Upstate Medical University alumni